Al-Hasa is a sub-district located in Nati' District, Al Bayda Governorate, Yemen.  Al-Hasa had a population of 799  according to the 2004 census.

References 

Sub-districts in Nati' District